Heidi Victoria (born Heidi Mitterlehner on 12 October 1967) is a professional photographer and former Australian politician. She was a member of the Victorian Legislative Assembly, representing Bayswater for the Liberal Party from 2006 to 2018.

Early life
Victoria was born in Melbourne to an Austrian father and a New Zealand mother. She completed her HSC in 1984, and went on to complete her BA in Fine Art Photography in 1988 at the Phillip Institute of Technology (now part of RMIT University). Prior to her election, Victoria owned and operated her own photography business, specialising in portraits and event photography.

Political career
Within the Liberal Party, Victoria has served as branch president, vice-president and secretary; state and federal electorate council delegate; fundraiser; branch development officer; and State council and Federal conference delegate. She was elected to the seat of Bayswater at the November 2006 election. In November 2009, she was named Shadow Parliamentary Secretary for Arts, following her strong involvement in the campaign to prevent the proposed changes to the Victorian College of the Arts.

After Ted Baillieu resigned as Premier in March 2013, Victoria was given the ministerial portfolios of Arts, Women's Affairs and Consumer Affairs within the Denis Napthine cabinet.

Controversies
In July 2009, Victoria was asked to apologise for using unparliamentary language during a late night parliamentary debate.

In early November 2014, multiple election campaign signs for Heidi Victoria were defaced with swastikas and offensive language throughout the Heathmont and Bayswater area. Victoria was quoted saying “The other reason this is really disappointing is that we pride ourselves in Australia as being a free country and democratic society"

References

External links
 Parliamentary voting record of Heidi Victoria at Victorian Parliament Tracker
 

1967 births
Living people
Members of the Victorian Legislative Assembly
Victorian Ministers for Women
Liberal Party of Australia members of the Parliament of Victoria
Politicians from Melbourne
RMIT University alumni
Australian people of Austrian descent
Australian people of New Zealand descent
21st-century Australian politicians
21st-century Australian women politicians
Women members of the Victorian Legislative Assembly
20th-century Australian photographers